Andalhualá is a village and municipality in Catamarca Province in northwestern Argentina.

See also
Atacama people

References

Populated places in Catamarca Province